Greggory D. "Poncho" Northington (1948 – February 11, 2017) was an American professional basketball player. He emerged as a prospect while playing at Harry E. Wood High School in his hometown of Indianapolis, Indiana, where he set an Indianapolis season scoring record during his senior year while he established himself as an outstanding defensive player. Northington received athletic scholarships offers from major universities nationally but ultimately committed to play for Murray State College, where he played his freshman season. He then transferred to play for the Alabama State Hornets, where he played for the rest of his collegiate career.

Northington was selected in the 1971 NBA draft as the 34th overall pick by the New York Knicks but elected to return to the Hornets for his senior season. Although he was expected to be a first round draft pick in the 1972 NBA draft, he fell to the third round where he was selected with the 47th overall pick by the Los Angeles Lakers. Despite his being a two-time NBA draft choice, Northington never played in the National Basketball Association (NBA). He spent the 1978 season playing for the Indiana Wizards of the All-American Basketball Alliance (AABA).

References

Date of birth missing
1948 births
2017 deaths
African-American basketball players
Alabama State Hornets basketball players
American men's basketball players
Basketball players from Indianapolis
Centers (basketball)
Los Angeles Lakers draft picks
New York Knicks draft picks
Parade High School All-Americans (boys' basketball)
20th-century African-American sportspeople
21st-century African-American people